Louviers is an unincorporated town, a post office, and a census-designated place (CDP) located in and governed by Douglas County, Colorado, United States. The CDP is a part of the Denver–Aurora–Lakewood, CO Metropolitan Statistical Area. The Louviers post office has the ZIP Code 80131 (post office boxes). At the United States Census 2010, the population of the Louviers CDP was 269, while the population of the 80131 ZIP Code Tabulation Area was 243.

History
Louviers was laid out by the DuPont Company in 1906, and named after Louviers, the Delaware estate of the Du Pont family. The Louviers Post Office has been in operation since 1907.

Geography
The eastern border of Louviers is U.S. Route 85, which leads north  to the center of Denver and southeast  to Castle Rock, the Douglas County seat.

Demographics

Education
The Douglas County School District serves Louviers.

See also

Outline of Colorado
Index of Colorado-related articles
State of Colorado
Colorado cities and towns
Colorado census designated places
Colorado counties
Douglas County, Colorado
List of statistical areas in Colorado
Front Range Urban Corridor
North Central Colorado Urban Area
Denver-Aurora-Boulder, CO Combined Statistical Area
Denver-Aurora-Broomfield, CO Metropolitan Statistical Area

References

External links

Louviers Village @ History Colorado
Louviers @ ColoradoEncyclopedia.org
Douglas County website
Louviers Exhibit
Douglas County School District

Census-designated places in Douglas County, Colorado
Census-designated places in Colorado
Denver metropolitan area
1906 establishments in Colorado]